Leonida Lucchetta (born 28 August 1911, date of death unknown) was an Italian professional football player.

1911 births
Year of death missing
Italian footballers
Serie A players
Inter Milan players
Association football midfielders